Scotocesonia is a monotypic genus of South American ground spiders containing the single species, Scotocesonia demerarae. It was first described by Lodovico di Caporiacco in 1947, and has only been found in Guyana.

References

Gnaphosidae
Monotypic Araneomorphae genera
Spiders of South America